Takuma Yoshida (吉田 拓馬, Yoshida Takuma, born 11 October 1994) is a Japanese water polo player. He competed in the 2020 Summer Olympics.

References

1994 births
Living people
Sportspeople from Yokohama
Water polo players at the 2020 Summer Olympics
Japanese male water polo players
Olympic water polo players of Japan
Asian Games silver medalists for Japan
Asian Games medalists in water polo
Water polo players at the 2018 Asian Games
Medalists at the 2018 Asian Games
21st-century Japanese people